The Full Impact Pro (FIP) Florida Championship is a professional wrestling championship created and promoted by the American independent professional wrestling promotion Full Impact Pro.

History 
The first FIP Florida Heritage Champion was crowned on March 10, 2007, when Erick Stevens defeated Roderick Strong in the finals of a one night tournament in Crystal River, Florida at the Eddie Graham Memorial Battle for the Belts.

Eddie Graham Memorial Battle Of The Belts (2007)

Reigns 
Erick Stevens was the inaugural champion. Jon Davis holds three records with the title: he record for most reigns at two, his second reign is the longest reign at 1,092 days, and he is the only wrestler to have held the title for a consecutive two years. Danhausen's second reign of 1 day is the shortest in the title's history. Davis also has the longest combined reign at 1469 days. Gran Akuma is the oldest champion when he won it at 38 years old while Chris Jones is the youngest champion at 19 years old.

Anthony Greene is the current champion in his first reign. He defeated Troy Hollywood at WWN Supershow: Battle Of The Belts on November 14, 2021 in Crystal River, FL.

Combined reigns

References

External links
Full Impact Pro
 FIP Florida Heritage Title History at Cagematch.net

Full Impact Pro championships
WWNLive championships
State professional wrestling championships